Walt Trowbridge may refer to:

Walt Trowbridge, character in It Can't Happen Here
Walt Trowbridge (Person of Interest), fictional character